Siudek is a Polish surname. Notable people with the surname include:

Dorota Siudek (born 1975), Polish pair skater and coach, wife of Mariusz
Mariusz Siudek (born 1972), Polish pair skater

See also
Sidek

Polish-language surnames